Patrick Rimoux, born 17 March 1958 in France, is a light sculptor. He lives in Paris where he runs the Patrick Rimoux Agency.

Biography 

Patrick Rimoux is a contemporary artist and engineer, who works primarily with new French technologies. As a light sculptor, Rimoux modulates light and uses it as an artistic medium. Known for his town monuments, he has also exhibited his work at the Galerie Baudoin Lebon in Paris, the Galerie Valérie Bach in Brussels, and the Matthieu Foss Gallery in Bombay.

Urban light 

A graduate of the Ecole Nationale Supérieure with a technological education, Rimoux also trained as an engineer at the Beaux Arts in Paris, where he studied at the studio of Claude Viseux.
Meeting with Henri Alekan for the project Paths of Light was an important step in his artistic career because it helped define light as his medium of choice.

Rimoux's projects are primarily urban sized; he works with light at the city level. Rimoux works with well-directed public spaces and architectural ensembles to integrate light into the urban landscape. He uses light reflection to make this integration look organic and natural.

Rimoux has worked on the Grand-Place in Brussels, dresses the front of the French Embassy in New York City, and created the scenography of light around the Centre Pompidou-Metz.

Rimoux collaborated with the composer Louis Dandrel for the Garden of Sound and Light at La Borie, Limoges.

Light events 

Rimoux produces light works for special events. Making himself the third component of staging, he accompanied his light dance performances as Cayenne in Dancing the City. He also illustrated the scene where Phaedra represented India alongside Astrid Bas and George Lavaudant.

Rimoux has participated in several festivals, such as the Eclectic Rocamadour and the Festival of the Word at Charity Sur Loire, where he created a work that showed the figure of Cardinal de Bernis.

Light design 

Rimoux uses his knowledge of new technologies, innovative designs, and new lighting techniques, and theatrical light modulation to create his designs.

One such design was a light piece for the Freedom Towers in Soweto, South Africa. The sculpture, commissioned by Nelson Mandela, consists of five black concrete columns mingled with nine white concrete columns. Dimming carried on these surfaces creates the movement of colors, making a meaningful sculpture.
Another of Rimoux's designs was lighting of the Rue de la Loi, where he created customized "poles of light".

Contemporary work 

His personal artistic work focuses on cinematography films that crystallize the question of revealing light. In France, he worked with the raw 35mm film material of Wim Wenders, Michael Haneke, and Akira Kurosawa. In 2010, exposure in the Baudoin Lebon gallery led him to work with the actress Sandrine Bonnaire.

While in India, staying at the guest house at the French Alliance and the Embassy of France in Delhi, Rimoux discovered the riches of Bollywood cinema, especially in regards to light and how it affixes to film, opening spaces that appear to be colored distillation of the atmosphere of the country. Rimoux was so taken with Bollywood that in 2011 and 2012 he exhibited several works at the exhibition of the India Art Fair in Delhi.

Main achievements

Permanent creations 
 Lighting for the Ministry of Defence, Architecture by Nicolas Michelin, Balard, Paris, 2011
 Permanent work for the cloister of the Benedictines of the city of Words, La Charité-sur-Loire, France, 2011, 70 m long video projection
 Light scenography around the Centre Pompidou-Metz, France, 2010
 Light scenography of the Cher Bridge for the new tramway, Tours, France, 2010
 Lighting of Europe's Ring, Brussels, 2010
 Survey for the Grand-Place, Brussels, 2010
 Lighting of the Euro Mediterranean Research Center & Ingémédia Institute. Architecture by Nicolas Michelin, Toulon, France, 2010
 Light scenography for the glass partition of ARTEM. Architecture by Nicolas Michelin, Nancy, France, 2009
 Survey for Brussels North, Brussels, 2009
 Wharf & Place du Débarcadère, Saint Paul, La Réunion, France, 2009
 Centre of the Francophony of America, 400 years of Québec, Québec, Canada, 2008
 City Hall of Québec, 400 years of Québec, Québec, 2008
 Brabant Bridge, Saint Josse, Belgium, 2007
 Garden of the Lighting Sounds project, Cultural Centre, La Borie, France, 2007
 Cayenne lightpole, Cayenne, French Guiana, 2005
 Light survey for Cayenne, French Guiana, 2005
 Freedom Towers, Soweto, South Africa, 2005
 Sculpture for the commemoration of the Heysel tragedy, Brussels, 2005
 Place de l'Albertine, Brussels, 2004
 Nelson Mandela Bridge, Johannesburg, South Africa, 2003
 Brussels lightpole, Rue de la Loi, Belgium, 2003
 Argenton sur Creuse, France, 2003
 Royal saltworks, survey, Arc et Senans, France, 2001
 Boulevard Beaurivage, La Ciotat, France, 1999
 Viaduct, Nevers, France, 1999
 The cliff and fortress of Mornas, France, 1999
 Boulevard du centenaire, Brussels, 1999
 Brussels Exhibition Centre, Belgium, 1999
 Summer Solstice, Ixelles, Belgium, 1998
 Light paths on Maurice Utrillo Street. Montmartre, Paris, 1997
 Light paths on Chevalier de la Barre Street, Montmartre, Paris,  1997
 100 Years, 100 Directors, 100 Films, Brussels, 1996
 Light path, Aignay le Duc, France, 1992
 Funeral monument for Henri Langlois, Montparnasse, Paris, 1990

Temporary creations and events 

 Rangoli of Light, New Delhi, 2011
 The Hundred Words of the Bernis Cardinal, Festival du Mot, La Charité-sur-Loire, France, 2011
 Centenary of the Museum of Art and History of Geneva, Switzerland, 2010
 150th anniversary of the French consulate in Québec, Canada, 2010
 Phèdre de Sénèque, Scenography from Astrid Bas, Le Centquatre, Paris, France, 2010
 Criée, son crépuscule, Autumn Festival in Normandy, Dieppe, France, 2009
 Song of Songs, MoMA PS1, New York City, 2009
 Payne Whitney Mansion, French American Cultural Exchange, 972 Fifth Avenue, New York City, 2009
 Light scenography for Va vis, Norma Claire's choreography, Ivry, France, 2007
 Dance the City, City Hall, Cayenne, French Guiana, 2007
 Church Sainte Croix, Liège adorned with colors, Liège, Belgium, 2007
 Palais des Princes Evèques, Liège adorned with colors, Liège, Belgium, 2007
 Secret trail, Courtyard of the Palais des Princes Evêques, Liège, Belgium, 2006
 Liège adorned with colours, Liège, Belgium, 2005
 Dance the City, Cayenne, French Guiana, 2005
 D'Amarante à Zinzolin, Sauroy Mansion, Paris, 2005
 Dance the City, Cayenne, French Guiana, 2004
 The Imaginary Gardens, Terrasson Lavilledieu, France, 2004
 The Lighted Eclectics, 2,500 Souls, Rocamadour, France, 2004
 Dance the City, Cayenne, French Guiana, 2003
 Winter Delights, Grand-Place, Brussels, 2003
 Winter Delights, The Forest, Grand-Place, Brussels, 2002
 Winter Delights, The Meadow, Grand-Place, Brussels, 2001
 Le Plateau, Inauguration of the center for contemporary art F.R.A.C., Paris, 2002
 Twice yearly festival of contemporary art, Nîmes, France, 2002
 Love is sweet, Norma Claire's choreography, Beauvais, France. 2001
 Installation in the undergrounds of Provins, France, 1995

Installations and exhibitions 

 Exhibition at the Matthieu Foss Gallery, Mumbai, India, 2011
 Map of the Light, scenography around the Centre Pompidou-Metz
 Cyclopes, lightpoles, Baudoin Lebon Gallery, Paris, 2010
 Elle's Appelle Sabine, from Sandrine Bonnaire, 35mm film, plexiglass, resin, Baudoin Lebon Gallery, Paris, 2010
 Fantasy in Colors, Rythmetic from Norman McLaren, 35mm film, plexiglass, resin, Baudoin Lebon Gallery, Paris, 2010
 Films 35 mm, resin, optical lens, Galerie Le Café Français, Brussels, 2009
 Brussels New York, Photography exhibition, Galerie Le Café Français, Brussels, 2009
 Brussels Sheep, Immersed ticket office, Congrès Train Station, Brusells, 2009
 Installation with 35 mm films, Photography exhibition about the Grand-Place, Congrès Train Station, Brussels, 2009
 Pheadra in India, Film sculpture for a theater play by Astrid Bas and Georges Lavaudant, Delhi and Bombay, India, 2008
 Piccolo Teatro: Archi 4, Plexiglass and LED spotlights, France, 2007, 1.40 x 1.80 m
 Installation VUIT ND 2835N7712E P4848N220E TON, Louis Vuitton's exhibition room, Champs Elysées, Paris, 2006
 Cage, 35 mm films, resin, Louis Vuitton space, Champs Elysées, Paris, 2006
 exhibition «L Inde dans tous les sens». Louis Vuitton Space, Champs Elysées, Paris. 2006
 Exhibition at the French Alliance of New Delhi, India, 2006
 Installation with the 35 mm film of Le Cirque de Calder, Baudoin Lebon Gallery, Paris, 2005
 L'homme Qui Rétrécit and Installation with the 35 mm film La Chambre Obscure, Baudoin Lebon Gallery, Paris, 2005
 Reactograms for the EDF foundation, Paris, 2004
 Funny Games, L'homme Qui Plantait des Arbres, Maadadayo, Bar le Duc, France, 2003
 Installation with the 35 mm film Mortel Transfert by JJ Beineix, Bar le duc, France, 2003
 Passage, Grand Palais, 400 x 200 x 300 cm, and Installation, Beaux Arts, 1300 x 70 x 70 cm, Paris, 1990
 Odysée, sculpture for the Gan movie, Tunisie, 1989, 7 x 12 × 6 m

External links 
 Agence Patrick Rimoux, Sculpteur Lumière : www.patrickrimoux.fr

1958 births
Light artists
French artists
Living people